Maria-Joëlle Conjungo (born 14 July 1975 in Bangui) is a retired athlete from the Central African Republic who specialised in the 100 metres hurdles. She competed at two consecutive Olympic Games, starting in 2000, without reaching the second round.

Her personal bests of 13.51 (100 m hurdles) and 8.38 (60 m hurdles) are current national records. Her brother, Mickaël Conjungo, is also a national record holder.

Competition record

References

External links

1975 births
Living people
People from Bangui
Central African Republic female hurdlers
Athletes (track and field) at the 2000 Summer Olympics
Athletes (track and field) at the 2004 Summer Olympics
Olympic athletes of the Central African Republic
World Athletics Championships athletes for the Central African Republic
Central African Republic emigrants to France
Athletes (track and field) at the 1999 All-Africa Games
Athletes (track and field) at the 2003 All-Africa Games
African Games competitors for the Central African Republic